Queen Mary's School is a private day and boarding school for girls in Baldersby Park near Topcliffe, between Ripon and Thirsk in North Yorkshire, England. It caters to girls aged 3 to 16 and boys up to age 7. The school is a member of the Woodard Corporation and attended the 200th anniversary of the birth of the movement's founder in 2011. In 2015 the school celebrated its 90th anniversary.

History
In 1925 the Woodard Corporation established a girls' preparatory boarding school in the mansion of Duncombe Park, near Helmsley. The number of pupils increased from 23 to 59 after one year and in 1931 the School of Duncombe Park was renamed Queen Mary's School. In 1979 a senior school was added to the preparatory school. In 1985 the lease on Duncombe Park expired and the school moved to Baldersby Park.

Baldersby Park 
Baldersby Park, formerly known as Newby Park, covers an area of some 200 acres, which includes the site of the deserted medieval village of Newby-on-Swale. Baldersby Park House was built in the early 18th century by Sir William Robinson to the designs of Colen Campbell. It was the first villa built in England in the Palladian style.  In 1845 Lord de Grey sold Newby Park to the railway magnate George Hudson. Hudson rebuilt the house as Baldersby Park, providing it with a northern front in a Jacobethan style, retaining its Georgian south front. The interior was reconstructed after a fire in 1902.  It is now a Grade I listed building.

Since 2010, Baldersby Park has been the location of the Deer Shed Festival, an annual music, arts and science festival attracting up to 10,000 paying attendees each year.

Houses 
There are four houses, which have regular inter-house competitions, including cross-country, drama, music and debating and general knowledge competitions. There are also regular 'house meetings' where senior girls fulfil their inter-house responsibilities.

The four houses, named after local abbeys are Byland (blue), Fountains (yellow), Jervaulx (green) and Rievaulx (red). Traditionally, sisters are in the same house, yet cousins are sometimes in different houses. All teachers are also assigned to houses and assist the senior girls by mentoring.

Music
The school is well known throughout North Yorkshire for its music especially its Chapel Choir which has released three CDs of music (Praise ye the Lord - 2000, Ave Maria - 2005 and The Turning Stars - 2013) and has contributed to local musicians' CDs such as Spanish guitarist Eduardo Niebla. They feature in his 2010 album 'My Gypsy Waltz'.

Old Girls
The Queen Mary's Association (formerly known as the Duncombists) is the Old Girls Association for the school. In 2014 it was relaunched ahead of the schools 90th Birthday in 2015. To celebrate the 90th Anniversary the QMA is organizing a number of events including a return visit to Duncombe Park as well as a reunion at the school.

References

External links

Profile on the ISC website

Girls' schools in North Yorkshire
Boarding schools in North Yorkshire
Private schools in North Yorkshire
Educational institutions established in 1921
Woodard Schools
1921 establishments in England
Member schools of the Girls' Schools Association
Church of England private schools in the Diocese of York